Calling All Cars is a 1935 American crime film directed by Spencer Gordon Bennet and starring Jack La Rue, Lillian Miles and Jack Norton. It was originally made for distribution by Mayfair Pictures, but the company had ceased business by the time of its release.

Cast
 Jack La Rue as Jerry Kennedy  
 Lillian Miles as Kay Larson  
 Jack Norton as Duke Costello  
 Eddie Fetherston as Marty Blake / Marty Dempsey  
 Harry Holman as Judge Marlowe  
 Ernie Adams as Reporter 
 Arthur Millett as Policeman

References

Bibliography
 Pitts, Michael R. Poverty Row Studios, 1929–1940: An Illustrated History of 55 Independent Film Companies, with a Filmography for Each. McFarland & Company, 2005.

External links
 

1935 films
1935 crime drama films
1930s English-language films
American crime drama films
Films directed by Spencer Gordon Bennet
American black-and-white films
Mayfair Pictures films
1930s American films